The Shwe Indein Pagoda is a group of Buddhist pagodas in the village of Indein, near Ywama and Inlay Lake in Shan State, Myanmar (formerly Burma).

The pagodas were commissioned during the reign of King Narapatisithu. However, tradition holds that they were built by King Ashoka (known in Burmese as Dhammasoka ), and renewed by King Anawrahta. However, there is no archaeological evidence to support this theory.

Photo gallery

Notes

References

Buildings and structures in Shan State
13th-century Buddhist temples
Pagodas in Myanmar